Gikor is a 1982 Armenian drama film based on Hovhannes Tumanyan's poem of the same name. In USSR, the film was released on 15 May 1982. The film was directed by Sergey Israelyan.

Plot

A village boy, Gikor by name, meets his tragic fate when he is sent to the city (Tiflis by his father, Hambo (Sos Sargsyan) to work for a rich trader, Bazaz Artem (Armen Dzhigarkhanyan).

Cast

Albert Gulinyan as GikorSos Sargsyan as HamboGalya Novents as NaniArmen Dzhigarkhanyan as Bazaz ArtemZhenya Avetisyan as NatoEmma StepanyanL. YeghiazaryanHaykanush YeremyanM. TovmasyanS. KhambekyanSvetlana KirakosyanMeline HamamjyanYe. ManvelyanTigran VoskanyanA. JraghatspanyanLeonard SarkisovHarutyun MovsisyanS. AjabkhanyanR. AbalyanR. GyulumyanL. AzizyanStepan HarutyunyanArmen MazmanyanK. BarseghyanK. SimonyanG. GyulumyanA. KocharyanK. GrigoryanMargarita KarapetyanK. HovsepyanH. GhazaryanK. GhulinyanAra Stepanyan

References

External links
 

1982 drama films
1982 films
Soviet-era Armenian films
Armenfilm films
Films set in Tbilisi
Films based on works by Hovhannes Tumanyan
Armenian drama films
Armenian-language films